Austad Church may refer to:

 Austad Church (Bygland), a church in Bygland municipality in Agder county, Norway
 Austad Church (Lyngdal), a church in Lyngdal municipality in Agder county, Norway